Syzygium cordatum is an evergreen, water-loving tree, which grows to a height of 8–15 m. This tree is often found near streams, on forest margins or in swampy spots. The leaves are elliptic to circular, bluish green on top and a paler green below. Young leaves are reddish. The white to pinkish fragrant flowers are borne in branched terminals and have numerous fluffy stamens and produce abundant nectar. It flowers from August to November. The fruits are oval berries, red to dark-purple when ripe.

Common names are waterbessie (Afrikaans), undoni, umSwi, umJoni and hute (Shona), trâm mốc, trâm vối or vối rừng (Vietnamese). "Water berry" is also used for other species of Syzygium.

Distribution
Occurs along streambanks from Kwazulu-Natal northwards to Zimbabwe and Mozambique. It grows in forest margins, in bush or open grassy and sometimes high country.

Uses
This tree is known for its many uses. The fleshy fruit is slightly acidic in flavour and is eaten by children, monkeys, bush-babies, bats and  birds. The berries are also used to sometimes make an alcoholic drink. The powdered bark is used as a fish poison. In central Africa the tree is known as a remedy for stomach ache and diarrhoea. It is also used to treat respiratory ailments and tuberculosis

Gallery

See also
List of fruits

External links

cordatum
Trees of Africa
Flora of South Tropical Africa
Flora of the Democratic Republic of the Congo
Flora of Mozambique
Flora of Zimbabwe
Trees of South Africa
Fruits originating in Africa